Crematogaster rogenhoferi, is a species of ant of the subfamily Myrmicinae, which can be found from Sri Lanka.

Subspecies
Crematogaster rogenhoferi costulata Emery, 1895 - Myanmar
Crematogaster rogenhoferi fictrix Forel, 1911 - Borneo
Crematogaster rogenhoferi lutea Emery, 1893 - Indonesia
Crematogaster rogenhoferi rogenhoferi Mayr, 1879 - Borneo, Philippines, India, Sri Lanka, Myanmar, Thailand, Vietnam, China

References

External links

 at antwiki.org
Animaldiversity.org
Itis.org

rogenhoferi
Hymenoptera of Asia
Insects described in 1879